Elater abruptus is a species of click beetle in the family Elateridae. It is found in the Canadian provinces of Manitoba, Ontario, New Brunswick, Nova Scotia, and Quebec as well as the U.S. state of Rhode Island.

References

Elateridae
Beetles described in 1825